Kevin Leonard is a journalist and reporter for BBC news online and the BBC Wales Today news programme.

References

British television presenters
Welsh journalists
BBC newsreaders and journalists
Living people
Year of birth missing (living people)
Place of birth missing (living people)